Kevin R. Constantine Gutzman (born May 20, 1963) is an American constitutional scholar and historian.  He is Professor of History at Western Connecticut State University.

Biography
Gutzman holds a B.A. from the University of Texas (1985); a J.D. from the University of Texas School of Law (1990), a Master of Public Affairs from the LBJ School of Public Affairs, University of Texas (1990), and an M.A. (1994) and the PhD (1999) in history from the University of Virginia.

In addition to scholarly articles, Gutzman has written scholarly books including, Virginia’s American Revolution: From Dominion to Republic, 1776-1840 in which he argues that it was the intense commitment of politically active Virginians that led them not only to break away from Britain, but to then produce the first state constitution based on a bill of rights.  He further argued that the Virginians who ratified the United States Constitution in 1788 understood it as a revocable agreement entered into by 13 sovereign states.

Gutzman's works for a popular audience include  The Politically Incorrect Guide to the Constitution, which was named one of the "Top Ten Conservative Books of 2007" by Human Events, and Who Killed the Constitution?

Books
 The Politically Incorrect Guide to the Constitution (Washington, DC: Regenery Publishing, 2007).
 Virginia’s American Revolution: From Dominion to Republic, 1776-1840 (Maryland: Lexington Books, 2007)   
 Who Killed the Constitution? The Federal Government vs. American Liberty from World War I to Barack Obama, co-authored with Thomas Woods (New York: Crown Forum, 2008)
 James Madison and the Making of America (New York: St. Martin's Press, 2012)
 Thomas Jefferson - Revolutionary: A Radical's Struggle to Remake America (New York: St. Martin's Press, 2015)
 The Jeffersonians: The Visionary Presidencies of Jefferson, Madison, and Monroe (New York: St. Martin's Press, 2022)

2008 Presidential Election
On a 2012 radio show of pundit Mike Church, Gutzman stated that he voted for Barack Obama in the 2008 United States presidential election, which upset some fans of Church's show. "I voted for Obama," said Gutzman, "because he was the only one promising to end the wars, and he didn't do it, but that's the reason why." Church responded to angry listeners in defense of Gutzman, pointing out that McCain in particular and the Republican Party in general were, from Gutzman's as well as his own perspective, hardly "lesser evils."

References

External links
 Kevin Gutzman's website

Living people
21st-century American historians
Historians of Colonial North America
Historians of the United States
Historians of Virginia
Human Events people
National Review people
American political writers
American male non-fiction writers
American scholars of constitutional law
1963 births
Western Connecticut State University faculty
University of Texas at Austin alumni
University of Virginia alumni
People from Bethel, Connecticut
Historians from Connecticut